Carlos Isola (6 March 1896 – 8 February 1964) was an Argentine football goalkeeper. He played for River Plate from 1913 to 1925, and in four matches for the Argentina national football team in 1916. He was also part of Argentina's squad for the 1916, 1917 and 1919 South American Championships. Isola won three titles with River Plate.

Biography
Isola started in River Plate at 13 years old playing as inside left, but one day he replaced the goalkeeper of the club. After another absence, Isola played as goalkeeper again for the Zona Norte combined, with a great performance v British side Exeter City. Since then, Isola consolidated himself in that position, playing as the main goalkeeper for River Plate, with which he won the Copa de Competencia Jockey Club in 1914 and the Primera división title in 1920 (which was also the first league title for the club).

Isola left football in 1925 before his 20th birthday showing his disagreement with the amateurism (football was not professional in Argentina until 1931). In 1957, Isola returned to a field when he took part of an exhibition game to honour club legend Angel Labruna. He played only the fist 10 minutes of the match, then leaving his position to a young goalkeeper Amadeo Carrizo, who would also bome a legend of the club.

During his career, Isola scored two goals, one as goalkeeper in 1914 v Banfield and the other as forward v Porteño in 1918. Both goals were scored via penalty kick.

Titles
River Plate
 Copa de Competencia Jockey Club (1): 1914
 Tie Cup (1): 1914
 Primera División (1): 1920

References

External links
 

1896 births
1964 deaths
Argentine footballers
Argentina international footballers
Club Atlético River Plate footballers
Place of birth missing
Association football goalkeepers